Keystone 3 is a live album by drummer Art Blakey and The Jazz Messengers recorded at the Keystone Korner in San Francisco in 1982 and released on the Concord Jazz label.

Reception

Michael G. Nastos of Allmusic stated "Of the many live recordings with different Jazz Messengers lineups, this ranks among their best, and is a springboard for what the Marsalis brothers would offer as artists in their own right. With Blakey, this combination was special".

Track listing 
 "In Walked Bud" (Thelonious Monk) - 8:25   
 "In A Sentimental Mood" (Duke Ellington, Manny Kurtz, Irving Mills) - 7:15   
 "Fuller Love" (Bobby Watson) - 8:49   
 "Waterfalls" (Wynton Marsalis) - 11:28   
 "A La Mode" (Curtis Fuller) - 10:36

Personnel 
Art Blakey - drums
Wynton Marsalis - trumpet
Branford Marsalis - alto saxophone
Bill Pierce - tenor saxophone
Donald Brown - piano
Charles Fambrough - bass

References 

Art Blakey live albums
The Jazz Messengers live albums
1982 live albums
Concord Records live albums
Music of the San Francisco Bay Area
Albums recorded at Keystone Korner